"I'm Over You" is a song by the group Sequal from their 1988 debut album Sequal.

Track listing

US 12" single

Charts

References

1988 singles
Sequal (band) songs
1988 songs
Capitol Records singles
Songs written by Miguel A. Morejon